Saint Mary Coptic Orthodox Church in Haret el-Roum or the Church of the Virgin of Relief is a Coptic Orthodox church in al-Ghūrīya, Cairo near the Convent of Saint Theodore.

From 1660 to 1800 the church was the Seat of the Coptic Orthodox Pope of Alexandria.  In 1660 Pope Matthew IV of Alexandria transferred the seat from Ḥārat Zūwayla to Ḥārat al-Rūm, where it remained until 1800 when Pope Mark VIII transferred the patriarchal seat to Saint Mark's Coptic Orthodox Cathedral, Azbakeya.

Importance
Saint Mary Church grew in importance as the centre of the Coptic Church. Several Coptic Popes are buried in the church.

History
The church was rebuilt several times, and in 1794 Ibrahim El-Gohary renovated the church. It was damaged by fire during the reign of Pope Mark VIII (1797–1809) but was restored and rebuilt.

See also
Christian Egypt
List of Coptic Orthodox churches in Egypt

References

Coptic Orthodox churches in Cairo
Coptic history
Coptic architecture
Oriental Orthodox congregations established in the 17th century
10th-century establishments in the Fatimid Caliphate
10th-century churches in Egypt